Stadionul Aurul is a multi-use stadium in Brad, Romania. It is used mostly for football matches and is the home ground of Aurul Brad. The stadium holds 1,500 people.

References

Football venues in Romania
Buildings and structures in Hunedoara County
Brad, Hunedoara